The Globe Ticket Company Building was completed at 112 North 12th Street in Philadelphia in 1900 as a printing and warehouse facility for the Globe Ticket Company, which exclusively printed tickets. The building was liquidated and demolished in 1988 to make way for the convention center.

The Pennsylvania Convention Center now occupies the site and all nearby land.  The building was listed on the National Register of Historic Places in 1984, and has not been delisted.

The building was also known as the Hering building and featured an inscription to Constantine Hering, a homeopathic physician, in Latin.

See also

 National Register of Historic Places listings in Center City, Philadelphia

References

External links
 'Globe Ticket Company Building 

Industrial buildings and structures on the National Register of Historic Places in Pennsylvania
Industrial buildings completed in 1900
Buildings and structures in Philadelphia
Demolished buildings and structures in Philadelphia
Chinatown, Philadelphia
National Register of Historic Places in Philadelphia
Buildings and structures demolished in 1988